The third season of Food Wars!: Shokugeki no Soma anime television series, subtitled , was produced by J.C.Staff and directed by Yoshitomo Yonetani. The series was first broadcast in Japan on Tokyo MX. It aired from October 4, 2017 to June 25, 2018 with additional broadcasts on BS11 and Animax. In addition, AbemaTV streamed the season. The third season is broken into two parts. The first covers the Moon Festival when Soma Yukihira challenges Council of Ten Masters member Terunori Kuga to a challenge to see who can raise the most money during the three day event. At the end of the event, Erina Nakiri's father, Azami Nakiri, appears and takes over the school. He institutes a series of reforms, including the establishment of a new ruling body called the Central Gourmet Institute, and the elimination of all independent groups within Totsuki, including Polaris Dorm. The second part continues with the promotional exams where everyone is guaranteed to pass if they stick to the curriculum and follow Central's orders. However, Soma's group is targeted for expulsion because of their successful defense of Polaris Dorm and a few other independent groups. At the end of the second part, Soma's group of rebels challenges Azami's group to a Shokugeki, attempting to overthrow Azami.

In the United States, Adult Swim's Toonami programming block aired the English dub from February 28 to August 1, 2021.



Episode list

Home video releases

Japanese

English

Notes

References

External links
  
 
 

Food Wars!: Shokugeki no Soma episode lists
2017 Japanese television seasons
2018 Japanese television seasons
Split television seasons